Madhura Sangama is a 1978 Indian Kannada-language film, directed by T. P. Venugopal, starring Anant Nag, Radha Saluja and Ashok. The film has musical score by Rajan–Nagendra. One of the early multi-starrers of Kannada cinema. The movie had extended cameo appearances by a galaxy of stars in the Kumara Rama ballet.

Cast

 Anant Nag
 Ashok 
 Radha Saluja as Mala & Kala
 Srinath (Sp. App.)
 Manjula (Sp. App.)
 Vishnuvardhan (Cameo)
 Bharathi Vishnuvardhan (Cameo)
 Padmapriya (Cameo)
 Master Hirannayya (Cameo)
 Leelavathi
 K. S. Ashwath
 Vajramuni 
 Balakrishna
 Dwarakish
 Uma Shivakumar 
 Udaykumar
 Shakti Prasad

Soundtrack 

The film score and soundtrack was composed by Rajan–Nagendra. The soundtrack album consists of four tracks.

References

External links
 

1978 films
1970s Kannada-language films
Films scored by Rajan–Nagendra